Guinness World Records, known from its inception in 1955 until 1999 as The Guinness Book of Records and in previous United States editions as The Guinness Book of World Records, is a reference book published annually, listing world records both of human achievements and the extremes of the natural world. The brainchild of Sir Hugh Beaver, the book was co-founded by twin brothers Norris and Ross McWhirter in Fleet Street, London, in August 1955.

The first edition topped the best-seller list in the United Kingdom by Christmas 1955. The following year the book was launched internationally, and as of the 2022 edition, it is now in its 67th year of publication, published in 100 countries and 23 languages, and maintains over 53,000 records in its database.

The international franchise has extended beyond print to include television series and museums. The popularity of the franchise has resulted in Guinness World Records becoming the primary international authority on the cataloguing and verification of a huge number of world records. The organisation employs record adjudicators to verify the authenticity of the setting and breaking of records. Following a series of owners, the franchise has been owned by the Jim Pattison Group since 2008, with its headquarters moved to South Quay Plaza, Canary Wharf, London in 2017. Since 2008, Guinness World Records has orientated its business model toward inventing new world records as publicity stunts for companies and individuals, which has attracted criticism.

History

On 10 November 1951, Sir Hugh Beaver, then the managing director of the Guinness Breweries, went on a shooting party in the North Slob, by the River Slaney in County Wexford, Ireland. After missing a shot at a golden plover, he became involved in an argument over which was the fastest game bird in Europe, the golden plover or the red grouse (it is the plover). That evening at Castlebridge House, he realised that it was impossible to confirm in reference books whether or not the golden plover was Europe's fastest game bird. Beaver knew that there must have been numerous other questions debated nightly among the public, but there was no book in the world with which to settle arguments about records. He realised then that a book supplying the answers to this sort of question might prove successful. Beaver's idea became reality when Guinness employee Christopher Chataway recommended university friends Norris and Ross McWhirter, who had been running a fact-finding agency in London. The twin brothers were commissioned to compile what became The Guinness Book of (Superlatives and now) Records, in August 1954. A thousand copies were printed and given away.

After the founding of The Guinness Book of Records office at the top of Ludgate House, 107 Fleet Street, London, the first 198-page edition was bound on 27 August 1955 and went to the top of the British best-seller list by Christmas. The following year, it was introduced into the United States by New York publisher David Boehm and sold 70,000 copies. Since then, Guinness World Records has sold more than 100 million copies in 100 countries and 37 languages.

Because the book became a surprise hit, many further editions were printed, eventually settling into a pattern of one revision a year, published in September/October, in time for Christmas. The McWhirters continued to compile it for many years. Both brothers had an encyclopedic memory; on the BBC television series Record Breakers, based upon the book, they would take questions posed by children in the audience on various world records and were able to give the correct answer. Ross McWhirter was assassinated by two members of the Provisional Irish Republican Army in 1975 for offering a £50,000 reward for their capture. Following Ross's assassination, the feature in the show where questions about records posed by children were answered was called Norris on the Spot. Norris carried on as the book's sole editor.

Guinness Superlatives, later Guinness World Records Limited, was formed in 1954 to publish the first book. Sterling Publishing owned the rights to the Guinness book in the US for decades until it was repurchased by Guinness in 1989 after an 18-month long lawsuit. The group was owned by Guinness PLC and subsequently Diageo until 2001, when it was purchased by Gullane Entertainment for $65 million. Gullane was itself purchased by HIT Entertainment in 2002. In 2006, Apax Partners purchased HIT and subsequently sold Guinness World Records in early 2008 to the Jim Pattison Group, the parent company of Ripley Entertainment, which is licensed to operate Guinness World Records' Attractions. With offices in New York City and Tokyo, Guinness World Records' global headquarters remain in London, specifically South Quay Plaza, Canary Wharf, while its museum attractions are based at Ripley headquarters in Orlando, Florida, US.

Evolution

Recent editions have focused on record feats by individuals. Competitions range from obvious ones such as Olympic weightlifting to the longest egg tossing distances, or for longest time spent playing Grand Theft Auto IV or the number of hot dogs that can be consumed in three minutes. Besides records about competitions, it contains such facts such as the heaviest tumour, the most poisonous fungus, the longest-running soap opera and the most valuable life-insurance policy, among others. Many records also relate to the youngest people to have achieved something, such as the youngest person to visit all nations of the world, currently held by Maurizio Giuliano.

Each edition contains a selection of the records from the Guinness World Records database, as well as select new records, with the criteria for inclusion changing from year to year.

The retirement of Norris McWhirter from his consulting role in 1995 and the subsequent decision by Diageo Plc to sell The Guinness Book of Records brand have shifted the focus of the books from text-oriented to illustrated reference. A selection of records are curated for the book from the full archive but all existing Guinness World Records titles can be accessed by creating a login on the company's website. Applications made by individuals for existing record categories are free of charge. There is an administration fee of $5 to propose a new record title.

A number of spin-off books and television series have also been produced.

Guinness World Records bestowed the record of "Person with the most records" on Ashrita Furman of Queens, NY, in April 2009; at that time, he held 100 records, while he currently holds over 220.

In 2005, Guinness designated 9 November as International Guinness World Records Day to encourage breaking of world records. In 2006, an estimated 100,000 people participated in over 10 countries. Guinness reported 2,244 new records in 12 months, which was a 173% increase over the previous year. In February 2008, NBC aired The Top 100 Guinness World Records of All Time and Guinness World Records made the complete list available on their website.

Defining records

For many records, Guinness World Records is the effective authority on the exact requirements for them and with whom records reside, the company providing adjudicators to events to determine the veracity of record attempts. The list of records which the Guinness World Records covers is not fixed, records may be added and also removed for various reasons. The public is invited to submit applications for records, which can be either the bettering of existing records or substantial achievements which could constitute a new record. The company also provides corporate services for companies to "harness the power of record-breaking to deliver tangible success for their businesses."

Ethical and safety issues

Guinness World Records states several types of records it will not accept for ethical reasons, such as those related to the killing or harming of animals.

Several world records that were once included in the book have been removed for ethical reasons, including concerns for the well-being of potential record breakers. For example, following publication of the "heaviest fish" record, many fish owners overfed their pets beyond the bounds of what was healthy, and therefore such entries were removed. The Guinness Book also dropped records within their "eating and drinking records" section of Human Achievements in 1991 over concerns that potential competitors could harm themselves and expose the publisher to potential litigation. These changes included the removal of all spirit, wine and beer drinking records, along with other unusual records for consuming such unlikely things as bicycles and trees. Other records, such as sword swallowing and rally driving (on public roads), were closed from further entry as the current holders had performed beyond what are considered safe human tolerance levels. 
There have been instances of closed categories being reopened. For example, the sword swallowing category was listed as closed in the 1990 Guinness Book of World Records, but has since been reopened with Johnny Strange breaking a sword swallowing record on Guinness World Records Live. Similarly, the speed beer drinking records which were dropped from the book in 1991, reappeared 17 years later in the 2008 edition, but were moved from the "Human Achievements" section of the older book to the "Modern Society" section of the newer edition.

, it is required in the guidelines of all "large food" type records that the item be fully edible, and distributed to the public for consumption, to prevent food wastage.

Chain letters are also not allowed: "Guinness World Records does not accept any records relating to chain letters, sent by post or e-mail."

At the request of the U.S. Mint, in 1984, the book stopped accepting claims of large hoardings of pennies or other currency.

Environmentally unfriendly records (such as the releasing of sky lanterns and party balloons) are no longer accepted or monitored, in addition to records relating to tobacco or cannabis consumption or preparation.

Difficulty in defining records
For some potential categories, Guinness World Records has declined to list some records that are too difficult or impossible to determine. For example, its website states: "We do not accept any claims for beauty as it is not objectively measurable."

However, other categories of human skill relating to measurable speed such as "Worlds Fastest Clapper" were instated. On 27 July 2010, Connor May (NSW, Australia) set the record for claps, with 743 in 1 minute.

On 10 December 2010, Guinness World Records stopped accepting submissions for the "dreadlock" category after investigation of its first and only female title holder, Asha Mandela, determining it was impossible to judge this record accurately.

Change in business model
Traditionally, the company made a large amount of its revenue via book sales to interested readers, especially children. The rise of the Internet began to cut into book sales in the 2000s and forward, part of a general decline in the book industry. According to a 2017 story by Planet Money of NPR, Guinness began to realise that a lucrative new revenue source to replace falling book sales was the would-be record-holders themselves. While any person can theoretically send in a record to be verified for free, the approval process is slow. Would-be record breakers that paid fees ranging from US$12,000 to US$500,000 would be given advisors, adjudicators, help in finding good records to break as well as suggestions for how to do it, prompt service, and so on. In particular, corporations and celebrities seeking a publicity stunt to launch a new product or draw attention to themselves began to hire Guinness World Records, paying them for finding a record to break or to create a new category just for them.

Criticism
Guinness World Records was criticised by television talk show host John Oliver on the program Last Week Tonight with John Oliver in August 2019. Oliver pointed serious criticism at Guinness for taking money from authoritarian governments for pointless vanity projects as it related to the main focus of his story, President of Turkmenistan Gurbanguly Berdimuhamedow. Oliver asked for Guinness to work with Last Week Tonight to adjudicate a record for "Largest cake featuring a picture of someone falling off a horse," but according to Oliver, the offer did not work out after Guinness insisted on a non-disparagement clause. Guinness World Records denied the accusations and stated that they declined Oliver's offer to participate because "it was merely an opportunity to mock one of our record-holders," and that Oliver did not specifically request the record for the largest marble cake. As of 2021, the Guinness World Record for "Largest marble cake" remains with Betty Crocker Middle East, set in Saudi Arabia. Following Oliver's episode, Guinness World Records' ethics were subsequently called into question by human rights groups.

Museums

In 1976, a Guinness Book of World Records museum opened in the Empire State Building. Speed shooter Bob Munden then went on tour promoting The Guinness Book of World Records by performing his record fast draws with a standard weight single-action revolver from a Western movie-type holster. His fastest time for a draw was 0.02 seconds. Among exhibits were life-size statues of the world's tallest man, Robert Wadlow, and world's largest earthworm, an X-ray photo of a sword swallower, repeated lightning strike victim Roy Sullivan's hat complete with lightning holes and a pair of gem-studded golf shoes on sale for $6,500. The museum closed in 1995.

In more recent years, the Guinness company has permitted the franchising of small museums with displays based on the book, all currently located in towns popular with tourists: Tokyo, Copenhagen, San Antonio.
There were once Guinness World Records museums and exhibitions at the London Trocadero, Bangalore, San Francisco, Myrtle Beach, Orlando, Atlantic City, New Jersey, and Las Vegas, Nevada. The Orlando museum, which closed in 2002, was branded The Guinness Records Experience; the Hollywood, Niagara Falls, Copenhagen, and Gatlinburg, Tennessee museums also previously featured this branding.

Television series
Guinness World Records has commissioned various television series documenting world record breaking attempts, including:

Specials:
 Guinness World Records: 50 Years, 50 Records – on ITV (UK), 11 September 2004

With the popularity of reality television, Guinness World Records began to market itself as the originator of the television genre, with slogans such as "we wrote the book on Reality TV".

Gamer's edition

In 2008, Guinness World Records released its gamer's edition, a branch that keeps records for popular video game high scores, codes and feats in association with Twin Galaxies. The Gamer's Edition contains 258 pages, over 1,236 video game related world records and four interviews including one with Twin Galaxies founder Walter Day. The most recent edition is the Guinness World Records Gamer's Edition 2020, which was released 5 September 2019.

The Guinness Book of British Hit Singles

The Guinness Book of British Hit Singles was a music reference book first published in 1977. It was compiled by BBC Radio 1 DJs Paul Gambaccini and Mike Read with brothers Tim Rice and Jonathan Rice. It was the first in a number of music reference books that were to be published by Guinness Publishing with sister publication The Guinness Book of British Hit Albums coming in 1983. After being sold to Hit Entertainment, the data concerning the Official Chart Company's singles and albums charts were combined under the title British Hit Singles & Albums, with Hit Entertainment publishing the book from 2003 to 2006 (under the Guinness World Records brand). After Guinness World Records was sold to The Jim Pattison Group, it was effectively replaced by a series of books published by Ebury Publishing/Random House with the Virgin Book of British Hit Singles first being published in 2007 and with a Hit Albums book following two years later.

Other media and products

Board game
In 1975, Parker Brothers marketed a board game, The Guinness Game of World Records, based on the book.  Players compete by setting and breaking records for activities such as the longest streak of rolling dice before rolling doubles, stacking plastic pieces, and bouncing a ball off alternating sides of a card, as well as answering trivia questions based on the listings in the Guinness Book of World Records.

Video games
A video game, Guinness World Records: The Videogame, was developed by TT Fusion and released for Nintendo DS, Wii and iOS in November 2008.

Film
In 2012, Warner Bros. announced the development of a live-action film version of Guinness World Records with Daniel Chun as scriptwriter. The film version will apparently use the heroic achievements of record holders as the basis for a narrative that should have global appeal.

References

External links
 
 

 
Book series introduced in 1955
Publications established in 1955
Trivia books
World record databases
Reference publishers
Articles containing video clips
Records (superlatives)
Annual publications
1955 non-fiction books
1955 establishments in the United Kingdom
Gullane Entertainment